The 1970–71 County Championship was the 29th season of the Liga IV, the fourth tier of the Romanian football league system. The champions of each county association promoted to Divizia C without promotion play-off. The promotion play-off was not held this season, due to the expansion of Divizia C from next season, from eight series with 16 teams to twelve series of 14 teams.

County leagues

Alba County

Arad County

Argeș County

Bacău County

Bihor County

Bistrița-Năsăud County

Botoșani County

Brașov County

Brăila County

Bucharest

Buzău County

Caraș-Severin County

Cluj County

Constanța County

Covasna County

Dâmbovița County

Galați County

Gorj County

Harghita County

Hunedoara County

Ialomița County

Iași County

Ilfov County

Maramureș County

Mehedinți County

Mureș County

Neamț County

Olt County

Prahova County

Satu Mare County

Sălaj County

Sibiu County

Suceava County

Teleorman County

North Group

South Group

Championship final  

Sporting Roșiorii de Vede won the 1970–71 Teleorman County Championship and promoted to Divizia C.

Timiș County

Tulcea County

Vaslui County

Vâlcea County

Vrancea County

See also 

 1970–71 Divizia A
 1970–71 Divizia B
 1970–71 Divizia C

References

External links
 

Liga IV seasons
4
Romania